Taichung educational institutions are in Taichung city of Taiwan. They include bilingual kindergartens through elementary and secondary education too all forms of tertiary education. There are international schools to serve foreigners in the city as well as a handful of language institutes for foreigners to study Mandarin and Taiwanese.

Higher education

Universities
Universities offer four-year programs in a variety of subjects.  Taichung possesses both public and private universities.

Public universities
National Chung Hsing University – located in the southern part of the city of Taichung, Taiwan. With over 17,000 students, NCHU has seven colleges and a department of continuing education.
National Taichung University of Science and Technology –formerly known as National Taichung Institute of Technology (NTIT, Chinese: 國立台中技術學院) and National Taichung Nursing College (NTNC, Chinese: 國立台中護理專科學校), merged in 2011 to form the new institution. There are five colleges of NTUST: Business, Design, Languages and Language Applications, Information and Distribution Science, and Health. The university is located on two campuses in the heart of the city: the primary campus is near Yizhong Street (一中街), National Taichung First Senior High School and the National Taiwan University of Physical Education and Sports, while the secondary campus is located about 2 kilometers down Sanmin Road, near Taichung Hospital.
National Taichung University of Education – formerly known as National Taichung Teacher's College (NTTC, Chinese: 國立台中師範學院), is located in the West District of the city. It is the premier teacher training school in the city, training future teachers in all areas from early childhood to secondary education, including a research center for special education.
National Taiwan University of Sport – located in the North District. It is the top physical education university in Taiwan and also home to Taichung Baseball Field and the local soccer stadium.

Private universities

Feng Chia University – Feng Chia University was named after Chiu Feng-Chia. The main campus is located in Xitun District.
Tunghai University – Tunghai University is a university in Xitun District near Longjing Township.
Central Taiwan University of Science and Technology  – Located in the mountains of Dakeng, CTU has four colleges: Health Sciences, Nursing, Management, and Humanities and Social Sciences.  It was upgraded to university status in 2005 and is best known for its nursing and health sciences programs.
China Medical University – China Medical University is one of two large medical universities in the city.  It also has a highly regarded full-service training hospital adjacent to the university.
Ling Tung University – Located in Nantun District, the university offers highly regarded design and business programs.
Chung Shan Medical University – Chung Shan Medical University is another large medical university, this one on the southern part of the city.

Five-year Junior Colleges
These are schools that one enters after completing junior high schools (ninth year of education) and enters it for five years, essentially serving as your three high school years along with the first two years or tertiary education. One gains entry through participation in a national exam.

 Overseas Chinese University

Secondary education

Senior High Schools

Senior High Schools  are the next level of education for students who have completed their mandatory nine years of primary and lower secondary education. Admittance is based on performance in a national standardized examination that is administered annually. These schools are typically college preparatory, and graduates are expected to go on to pursue a four-year university education.

In Taichung, some of the most prestigious senior high schools include Taichung First Senior High School (established in 1915), Taichung Girls' Senior High School (founded in 1919), and Taichung Second Senior High School (established in 1922). Taichung First Senior High School is an all-boys school with a small number of female students admitted to special programs. Taichung Girl's Senior High School is the top-ranked girls' school in the city. Taichung Second Senior High School is also considered a highly reputable school and now accepts both boys and girls.

Wen Hua Municipal Senior High School is a relatively new school, but its modern campus and equipment have led it to become increasingly popular among students and parents.

In general, public high schools in Taichung are considered more desirable due to their lower tuition and greater resources. However, there are also several excellent private high schools in the city. Some of these schools also offer vocational programs as well as junior high school education.

Vocational High Schools
Taiwan also offers students the opportunity to study specific trades as opposed to going to a general high school.  Some vocational programs are highly academic (i.e. language programs) while others focus on preparing students for a job after graduation.

National Taichung Home Economics and Commercial High School
National Taichung Agricultural Senior High School
National Taichung Industrial High School
Kuang-Hwa Vocational High School of Technology

Special Secondary Schools
Taichung also offers special schools for deaf as well as those who have other learning impairments.

National Taichung School for the Deaf
National Taichung Special Education School

Junior high schools
Junior High School covers grades seven through nine and mark the culmination of mandatory education in Taiwan.  Taichung offers a full range of public and private junior high schools.

Primary education
Elementary school encompasses grades one through six.  Typically, students will attend a public school in the zone designated for where ones residence is registered, not where one actually lives.

International schools
Taichung has three international schools.  Two of them use English as the medium of instruction and offer an American-style curriculum, while the third is a school for Japanese children.  One must possess a foreign passport to attend any of these schools.

Morrison Academy
American School in Taichung
Taichung Japanese School
National Experimental High School at Central Taiwan Science Park

Mandarin and Taiwanese Training Centers

Taichung City/County offers three accredited Mandarin language programs.

Tunghai University Chinese Language Center
Providence University Chinese Language Education Center
Feng Chia University Language Center

Other schools
Taichung City has dozens of kindergartens and cram schools.  While many are registered with the government and can be found on the Chinese version of the Taichung Education Bureau website (see below), not all are.

Shane English School – Daya District – A private English language institution for Taiwanese citizens, taught by English speaking natives.

See also
Education in Taiwan

References

External links
  Note:While bilingual, the Chinese side has MUCH more information.

Universities

Colleges

Vocational High Schools

Special Education Schools

Public Elementary Schools
Note: Where English spellings differ from Chinese and English language sites, the spelling on the Chinese site is used.

International schools

Mandarin Language Centers

 
Taichung
Taichung
Taichung